Admiral Miller may refer to:

Andrew Miller (Royal Navy officer) (1926–1986), British Royal Navy rear admiral
DeWolfe Miller III (born 1959), U.S. Navy vice admiral
Francis Spurstow Miller (1863–1954), British Royal Navy admiral
Gerald E. Miller (1919–2014), U.S. Navy vice admiral
John W. Miller (1970s–2010s), U.S. Navy vice admiral
Michael H. Miller (born 1952), U.S. Navy vice admiral
Paul David Miller (born 1941), U.S. Navy admiral

See also
J. Donald Millar (1934–2015), National Institute for Occupational Safety and Health rear admiral